Group 6 of the 2019 UEFA European Under-21 Championship qualifying competition consisted of six teams: Sweden, Belgium, Turkey, Hungary, Cyprus, and Malta. The composition of the nine groups in the qualifying group stage was decided by the draw held on 26 January 2017, with the teams seeded according to their coefficient ranking.

The group was played in home-and-away round-robin format between 27 March 2017 and 16 October 2018. The group winners qualified directly for the final tournament, while the runners-up advanced to the play-offs if they were one of the four best runners-up among all nine groups (not counting results against the sixth-placed team).

Standings

Matches
Times are CET/CEST, as listed by UEFA (local times, if different, are in parentheses).

Goalscorers

Notes

References

External links
Under-21 Standings: 2017–19 qualifying, UEFA.com

Group 6